B1, B.I, B.1 or B-1 may refer to:

Biology and chemistry 
 Bradykinin receptor B1, a human protein
 Cinnamtannin B1, a condensed tannin found in cinnamon
 Combretastatin B-1, a stilbenoid found in Combretum sp.
 Fumonisin B1, a toxins produced by several species of Fusarium molds
 B-1 cell, a lymphocyte type
 Arecatannin B1, a tannin found in the betel nut
 Proanthocyanidin B1, a B type proanthocyanidin
 Vitamin B1, also known as thiamine

Media 
 B1 TV, a Romanian TV network
 A class of FM radio broadcasting in North America

Roads

Vehicles 

 Rockwell B-1 Lancer, a United States Air Force strategic bomber
 B1 (New York City bus) serving Brooklyn
 B1 type submarine, a World War II Imperial Japanese Navy submarine class
 Alsace-Lorraine B 1, an Alsace-Lorraine P 1 class steam locomotive
 Marussia B1, a high-performance luxury sports coupé built by Russian automaker Marussia Motors
 GS&WR Class B1, a Great Southern and Western Railway Irish steam locomotive
 HMS B1, a B-class submarine of the Royal Navy
 LB&SCR B1 class, an 1882 British express passenger steam locomotive
 GCR Class 8C, classified B1 during LNER ownership, reclassified B18 in 1943
 LNER Thompson Class B1, a British steam locomotive class
 NER Class B1, a class of British steam locomotives 
 NCC Class B1, a Northern Counties Committee Irish steam locomotive
 Pennsylvania Railroad class B1, an American electric locomotive
 Saturn B-1, a 1959 four-stage rocket
 USS B-1, a United States Navy B-class submarine
 Brasilsat B1, a 1994 communication satellite
 Char B1, a French heavy tank
 B1 Centauro, an Italian wheeled tank destroyer
 Boom XB-1 Baby Boom, an American technology demonstrator aircraft
 Finnish Steam Locomotive Class B1

Other 
 B1 (archive format)
 B1 (classification), a medical-based Paralympic classification for blind sport
 B-1/B-2 Visa, issued by the United States to a foreign citizen seeking to enter the United States of America for business purposes
 Brooklyn's Number One, a 1990s rapper from St Albans, Queens, United States appearing on the Kool G Rap's 4,5,6 1995 album
 A subclass of B-class stars
 B1, an international standard paper size (707 × 1000 mm), defined in ISO 216
 A level in the Common European Framework of Reference for Languages
 A security class in the TCSEC
 the code for permission to use specific land or premises for offices, light industry in town and country planning in the United Kingdom
 A sentient banana in the children's TV series Bananas in Pyjamas
 B1, a model of battle droid in the Star Wars franchise
 B1, Sydney Australia B-Line bus route
 Chopin's Ballade No. 1
 The darkest sky on the Bortle scale

See also 
 B01 (disambiguation)
 BI (disambiguation)
 1B (disambiguation)